C. sinensis  may refer to:
 Camellia sinensis, a plant species whose leaves and leaf buds are used to produce tea
 Celtis sinensis, the Chinese hackberry, a flowering plant species native to slopes in East Asia
 Centropus sinensis, the greater coucal or the crow pheasant, a bird species widespread  in Asia, from India, east to south China and Indonesia
 Cephalotaxus sinensis a coniferous shrub or small tree species native to central and southern China
 Citrus sinensis, the sweet orange
 Clonorchis sinensis, a human liver fluke species
 Cryptolepis sinensis, a plant species
 Cordyceps sinensis, a species of fungus

Synonyms
 Calyptraea sinensis, a synonym for Calyptraea chinensis, a sea snail species

See also
 Flora Sinensis